Joseph Sarsfield Malone (March 8, 1886 – February 26, 1942) was a Canadian professional ice hockey player. He played with the Montreal Canadiens of the National Hockey Association in the 1916-17 season.  He is also referred to as Steve Malone in newspaper accounts.

Malone's sports career was cut short by the death of his father.  He returned to Trois Rivieres to take over the family ship building business, which was renamed after him.

He was a brother of Foster Malone, and a second cousin of Joe and Jeff Malone.

References

1886 births
1942 deaths
Canadian ice hockey defencemen
Ice hockey people from Quebec
Montreal Canadiens (NHA) players
Sportspeople from Trois-Rivières